The Rosia Batteries are a group of artillery batteries in the British Overseas Territory of Gibraltar.

Description
These batteries are on the surround the east side of Rosia Bay. The batteries and the connected defensive wall are Class A listed buildings as designated by the Government of Gibraltar's Gibraltar Heritage Trust Act of 1989.

References

Batteries in Gibraltar